Sociaal Cultureel Sport Vereniging Takdier Boys also SCSV Takdier Boys or simply Takdier Boys, are a Surinamese football (soccer) club from Livorno, Suriname founded in 1952. The club compete in the Hoofdklasse, the highest level of football in Suriname.

In 2010 the club made it to the finals of the Surinamese Cup which they lost 2–0 to SV Excelsior.

References

Football clubs in Suriname
Football clubs in Livorno, Suriname
1952 establishments in Suriname
Association football clubs established in 1952